Georg Pazderski (born 6 October 1951) is a retired German officer (last rank: Colonel) and politician for the Alternative for Germany (AfD) party.

Biography

Pazderski was born 1951 in the West German city of Pirmasens and became a soldier in the Bundeswehr.

From 2017 to 2019 he has been one of the deputy leaders of the biggest German opposition party, the AfD.
From 2017 to 2021 Pazderski was chairman of his party group in the federal state diet of Berlin.
In the 2021 German federal election Pazderski is one of the leading candidates of the 'landesliste' of his party in the federal state of Berlin.

References

1951 births
Alternative for Germany politicians
Living people